Johannes Justus (born 13 October 1962) is a South African cricketer. He played in six first-class and five List A matches for Boland from 1984/85 to 1990/91.

See also
 List of Boland representative cricketers

References

External links
 

1962 births
Living people
South African cricketers
Boland cricketers
Cricketers from Bellville, South Africa